Bestuzhev-Ryumin is a Russian masculine surname, its feminine counterpart is Bestuzheva-Ryumina. It may refer to
Alexey Bestuzhev-Ryumin (1693–1768), Grand Chancellor of Russia, son of Pyotr
Konstantin Bestuzhev-Ryumin (1829–1897), Russian historian, nephew of Mikhail
Mikhail Bestuzhev-Ryumin (1801–1826), Russian officer, an organizer of the Decembrist revolt
Mikhail Petrovich Bestuzhev-Ryumin (1688–1760), Russian diplomat, son of Pyotr and elder brother of Aleksey
Pyotr Bestuzhev-Ryumin (1664–1742), Russian statesman

See also
Bestuzhev (surname)
Ryumin

Russian-language surnames
Compound surnames